The 1974–75 season was Chelsea Football Club's sixty-first competitive season. Following a poor start to the season, manager Dave Sexton was sacked in October 1974 and replaced by his assistant Ron Suart. Suart in turn was succeeded by former Chelsea left-back Eddie McCreadie in April 1975. The club were relegated at the end of the season, bringing to an end a 12-year spell in the top-flight.

Table

References

External links
 1974–75 season at stamford-bridge.com

1974–75
English football clubs 1974–75 season